is a district located in Shimane Prefecture, Japan.

As of 2003, the district has an estimated population of 27,648 and a density of 30.10 persons per km2. The total area is 918.63 km2.

Towns and villages
Kawamoto
Misato
Ōnan

Mergers
On October 1, 2004 the towns of Iwami and Mizuho, and the village of Hasumi merged to form the new town of Ōnan.
On October 1, 2004 the town of Ōchi, and the village of Daiwa merged to form the new town of Misato.
On October 1, 2004 the town of Sakurae merged into the city of Gōtsu.

Districts in Shimane Prefecture